Tapana may refer to:

 Tapana, a hell in Naraka (Hinduism)
 Tapana, a hell in Naraka (Buddhism)
 Tapana (film), a 2004 Telugu romantic-drama film